Golden Wings over the Snowfield (雪域金翅) is a roller coaster located in Happy Valley Beijing. It was built by Vekoma and opened in 2006. It contains a cobra roll and a zero-G roll.

References

Happy Valley (amusement parks)
Roller coasters in China